Kentucky Route 86 (KY 86) is a  state highway in Kentucky that runs from KY 144 in the unincorporated community of Union Star to U.S. Route 62 (US 62) southeast of Cecilia.

Major intersections

References

0086
Transportation in Breckinridge County, Kentucky
Transportation in Hardin County, Kentucky